Dmitry Donskoy was a 5,061-ton German cargo ship which was built in 1943 as Eberhart Essberger. Taken as a British war prize in 1945, she was renamed Empire Ayr. She was allocated to the Soviet Union in 1946 and served until scrapped in 1974.

History
Eberhart Essberger was built by Öresundsvarvet, Landskrona, and launched on 11 May 1943. She was completed on 20 January 1944. She was built for J T Essberger, Hamburg. Eberhart Essberger participated in Operation Hannibal in January 1945. She was taken as a war prize in Kiel in May 1945 and ownership passed to the British Ministry of War Transport. Later that year, she was allocated to the Soviet Union and renamed Dimtry Donskoy (Дмитря Донскоя). She was operated by the Baltic Shipping Co, Leningrad, and served until she was scrapped in the fourth quarter of 1974.

Official Number and code letters
Official Numbers were a forerunner to IMO Numbers.

Empire Ayr had the UK Official Number 180681 and used the Code Letters GNPS

References

Ships built in Landskrona
World War II merchant ships of Germany
Merchant ships of the Soviet Union
1943 ships
Soviet Union–United Kingdom relations
Germany–Soviet Union relations
Empire ships
Ministry of War Transport ships